Attacin is a glycine-rich protein of about 20 kDa belonging to the group of antimicrobial peptides (AMP). It is active against Gram-negative bacteria.

Attacin was first discovered in Hyalophora cecropia, but is widely conserved in different insects from butterflies to fruit flies.

See also 
Diptericin, a structurally related antimicrobial peptide

References 

Insect immunity
Antimicrobial peptides